Pat Dwyer may refer to:

Patrick Dwyer (athlete) (born 1977), Australian athlete
Patrick Dwyer (boxer) (1894–1948), Irish Olympic boxer
Pat Dwyer (boxer, born 1946) (1946–2019), English boxer
Patrick Dwyer (ice hockey) (born 1983), American ice hockey player
Patrick Vincent Dwyer (1858–1931), Australian-born Roman Catholic bishop
Pat Dwyer (American football) (1884–1939), American football coach
Pat Dwyer (hurler), former Irish hurler